Perdue may refer to:

 Perdue (surname)
 Rural Municipality of Perdue No. 346, Saskatchewan, Canada
 Perdue, Saskatchewan, Canada
 Perdue Farms, an American chicken-farming corporation
 Perdue School of Business, in Salisbury University, Salisbury, Maryland

See also
 Purdue (disambiguation)